Mehdiabad-e Kalak Shuran (also Romanized as Mehdīābād-e Kālaḵ Shūrān; also known as Mehdīābād) is a village in Jastun Shah Rural District, Hati District, Lali County, Khuzestan Province, Iran. At the 2006 census, its population was 94, in 23 families.

References 

Populated places in Lali County